The China Tour is a China-based men's professional golf tour run by the China Golf Association. An earlier tour, the Omega China Tour, ran from 2004 to 2009.

From 2014 to 2016 the tour was organised with the PGA Tour China. From 2017 the two tours split and ran a separate schedule of events. Tournaments attracted world ranking points from 2014 to 2016 but not in 2017. Events regained world ranking status in 2018. Since 2018, the Order of Merit winner earns a European Tour card for the following season and the top five earn entry into the final stage of the Asian Tour's qualifying school.

Order of Merit winners

References

External links

Golf in China
Professional golf tours